Arniston may refer to: 
 Arniston, Midlothian, a village in Scotland
 Arniston House, an 18th-century country house in Scotland
 Arniston Rangers F.C., a Scottish junior football club
 Arniston, Western Cape, a small seaside settlement also known as Waenhuiskrans, South Africa
 Arniston (ship), an East Indiaman ship wrecked in 1815

See also
 Robert Dundas, of Arniston, the elder (1685–1753), Scottish judge
 Robert Dundas, of Arniston, the younger (1713–1787), Scottish judge
 Robert Dundas of Arniston (1758–1819), Scottish judge